The 2008 Laurence Olivier Awards were held in 2008 in London celebrating excellence in West End theatre by the Society of London Theatre.

Winners and nominees
Details of winners (in bold) and nominees, in each award category, per the Society of London Theatre.

Productions with multiple nominations and awards
The following 20 productions, including one ballet and four operas, received multiple nominations:

 11: Hairspray
 7: Parade
 6: War Horse
 5: Macbeth, The Drowsy Chaperone and The Lord of the Rings
 4: Othello
 3: Little Shop of Horrors, Pelléas and Mélisande and Saint Joan
 2: Agrippina, Boeing-Boeing, Dealer's Choice, Elling, Fiddler on the Roof, Jewels, La fille du régiment, The Man of Mode, The Seagull and The Turn of the Screw

The following six productions, including one ballet, received multiple awards:

 4: Hairspray
 2: Jewels, Macbeth, Saint Joan, The Man of Mode and War Horse

See also
 62nd Tony Awards

References

External links
 Previous Olivier Winners – 2008

Laurence Olivier Awards ceremonies
Laurence Olivier
Laur
Laurence Olivier Awards
Laurence Olivier Awards